In historical linguistics, the Canaanite shift is a vowel shift/sound change that took place in the Canaanite dialects, which belong to the Northwest Semitic branch of the Semitic languages family. This sound change caused Proto-NW-Semitic *ā (long a) to turn into ō (long o) in Proto-Canaanite. It accounts, for example, for the difference between the second vowel of Hebrew שלום (šalom, Tiberian šālōm) and its Arabic cognate سلام (salām). The original word was probably *šalām-, with the ā preserved in Arabic, but transformed into ō in Hebrew. The change is attested in records from the Amarna Period, dating it to the mid-2nd millennium BCE.

Nature and cause
This vowel shift is well attested in Hebrew and other Canaanite languages, but its exact nature is unclear and contested.

Theory of unconditioned shift
Many scholars consider this shift to be unconditioned. This position states that there were no conditioning factors such as stress or surrounding consonants which affected whether or not any given Proto-Semitic *ā became ō in Canaanite. Such scholars point to the fact that  Proto-Semitic *ā virtually always reflects as ō in Hebrew.

Theory of stress conditioning
Some other scholars point to Hebrew words like  səmālī (an adjective meaning "on the left"), in which the original *ā is thought to be preserved. Since such a preservation would be hard to explain by secondary processes like borrowing or analogy, they often assume that the shift was conditional and took place only in stressed syllables and that later, many words changed their form in analogy to other words in the same paradigm. As a result, the conditional nature of the shift became indistinct.

Responses to stress conditioning theory
Those who support a theory of unconditioned shift contend that stress conditioning does not account for the fact that often *ā became ō even in positions where it was neither stressed nor part of an inflectional or derivational paradigm, and that such forms as  may indeed be a secondary development, since  səmōl, the unsuffixed basic form of the word, actually does contain an o.

A parallel may be found in the pre-classical history of Latin, where a phenomenon called rhotacism affected all instances of intervocalic  turning them into . Thus rus (countryside), for example, took the oblique form ruri from *rusi. The phenomenon, naturally, failed to affect instances of intervocalic  formed after it had ceased to be productive.

In much the same way the shape of such words as  may, in fact, represent a secondary process occurring after the Canaanite shift ceased to be productive.

Arabic-Hebrew parallels
The shift was so productive in Canaanite languages that it altered their inflectional and derivational morphologies wherever they contained the reflex of a pre-Canaanite *ā, as can be seen in Hebrew, the most attested of Canaanite languages, by comparing it with Arabic, a well-attested non-Canaanite Semitic language.

Present participle of Qal verbs
Classical Arabic فاعل (fāʻil) vs. Tiberian Hebrew פועל (pōʻēl)

Feminine plural
Classical Arabic ات- (-āt) vs. Tiberian Hebrew  ות- (-ōṯ)

Noun
Classical Arabic فعال (fi‘āl, fa‘āl) vs. Tiberian Hebrew  פעול (pă‘ōl, pā‘ōl)

Classical Arabic فأل (faʼl) vs. Tiberian Hebrew  פול, פאל (pōl)

Other words

In one of the above lexical items (rōš), the shift did not only affect originally long vowels, but also originally short vowels occurring in the vicinity of a historically attested glottal stop in Canaanite.

Transcriptions of the Phoenician language reveal that the change also took place there – see suffete.

Uses of the shift
Often when new source material in an old Semitic language is uncovered, the Canaanite shift may be used to date the source material or to establish that the source material is written in a specifically Canaanite language. The shift is especially useful since it affects long vowels whose presence is likely to be recorded by matres lectionis such as aleph and waw, even in a defective consonantal script. In languages where the shift occurs, it also gives historical linguists reason to suppose that other shifts may have taken place.

See also
Chain shift
Great Vowel Shift

References

Bibliography
 
 
 
 

Language histories
Sound laws
Vowel shifts
Canaanite languages